The Colt Detective Special is a six-shot, carbon steel framed,  or  barreled, double-action revolver, and the first example of a class of firearms known as "snubnose revolvers". Made by Colt's Manufacturing Company, this model revolver, as the name "Detective Special" suggests, was intended to be a concealed weapon used by plainclothes police detectives.

Introduced in 1927, the Detective Special was the first short-barreled revolver produced with a modern swing-out frame. It was designed from the outset to be chambered for higher-powered cartridges such as the .38 Special, considered to be a powerful caliber for a concealable pocket revolver of the day. The Detective Special uses a slightly smaller frame than the Colt Official Police or Smith & Wesson Model 10 (K-Frame) revolvers, but is larger than the five-shot Smith & Wesson Model 36/Model 38/Model 42 (J-frame) revolvers.

Although the Detective Special proved to be an instant success when first introduced, lackluster sales saw the elimination of the Detective Special from the product line in 1996.

Design development

The Fitz Special

Reshaping the hammer and the butt allows the gun to be drawn quickly with little risk of the weapon snagging on clothing. The halved trigger guard facilitates quick trigger acquisition, even for shooters with large fingers or gloves.

Although historians disagree, it's believed that somewhere between 40 and 200 Fitz Specials left the Colt factory, made from various Colt revolvers, by Fitzgerald himself. The Fitz Special was the precursor to the modern snubnosed revolver and specifically the prototype for the Colt Detective Special, the first production two-inch snubnosed revolver. Even after the introduction of the Detective Special in 1927, Fitz continued to make custom revolvers for special clientele.

The Detective Special

Colt was so impressed with the Fitz Special that they decided to produce a sightly less radical version, the Detective Special, which is simply a shortened and somewhat streamlined Colt Police Positive Special. The Detective Special proved to be an instant success and was made until 1996.

Colt's Detective Special went through several issues or series. The First Series was produced from 1927 to 1946. Compared to later production models, the First Series used a narrower frame, with reduced clearance between the frontstrap of the gripframe and the rear of the trigger guard. Other distinctive features included a shorter ejector rod with an ungrooved, knurled tip; a checkered hammer spur and cylinder latch, a "half-moon"–shaped front sight, and an overlapping screw and locking pin set-up on the right side of the frame. Grip panels were wooden. A rounded butt on the metal frame became standard in 1933, but pieces with the original square butt (like that of the Police Positive Special) continued to be produced into the 1940s.

The Second Series ran from 1947 to 1972. The ejector-rod was longer and had a groove in its knurled tip; a three-inch-barrel variant was offered, with a yet longer ejector rod. The cylinder latch was smooth, and the trigger spur serrated. The right side frame screw has no locking pin, and the rear half of the front sight is a serrated ramp. The grip panels were plastic in 1947, but were changed back to wood starting in 1955 (first with a silver-tone Colt medallion, and later a gold-tone). An optional hammer shroud was available from the factory to prevent the hammer from catching on clothing.

Transition from the First to Second Series was gradual, with some post-WWII Second Series guns retaining short ejector rods and checkered hammers. Because of this, assigning a given revolver to a particular issue is best done by serial number.

During the 1960s, the grip frame of the Second Series Detective Special was shortened, matching that of Colt's other snub-nosed pistols, the Cobra and Agent. Despite this alteration, the Detective Special's overall grip size remained unchanged, as Colt fitted the Second Series with new, lengthened gripstocks that extended below the frame.

The Third Series ran from 1973 to 1986. A new shroud extended down from the barrel, enclosing and protecting the ejector rod, and the front sight was changed to a full ramp. New, oversize wood gripstocks were introduced that covered the front frame strap. The Third Series featured improvements to the revolver's internal lockwork as well. As with the previous two Series models, a few nickel-plated guns were produced, and a  barrel variant was again offered. In 1986, facing stagnant sales numbers as well as rising production and labor costs, Colt discontinued production of the Detective Special.

Colt filed for bankruptcy protection in 1992. After reorganization, the company restarted production of the Detective Special in 1992. The post-1991 Detective Special is sometimes called the Fourth Series, and featured "composite" (rubber), wrap-around grips with a gold medallion. Only a two-inch barrel was offered, in blue or hard chrome finish. The new production run continued only until 1996, when Colt introduced its stainless-steel SF-VI as a replacement for the Detective Special.

From its introduction, the Detective Special used Colt's ‘Positive Safety Lock’ (hammer block), first featured on the Police Positive; the mechanism interposes a bar between hammer and frame until the trigger is pulled, preventing accidental discharge if the hammer is struck (e.g., if a dropped gun falls onto its hammer) with the trigger forward. First and early Second Series Detective Specials are becoming highly sought after by collectors, particularly if they are in prime condition and still have the famous Colt "Royal Blue" finish.

Calibers and finishes
The Detective Special was initially available in both bright blued and nickel finishes; a stainless steel finish replaced the nickeled option during the Fourth Series. For the Second Series, caliber options were .32 New Police, .38 New Police, and .38 Special; only .38 Special was offered for the other Series models.

Submodels and variants
One early variant based on the DS frame was the Colt Banker's Special. First produced in 1928, it was chambered in .38 Colt New Police (.38 S&W) and .22 Long Rifle. Few were made, particularly in .22LR caliber. The Banker's Special was popular with railway clerks, who often carried them on mail and parcel freight trains prior to World War II. During World War II production was discontinued, and the type was not revived following the war's end.

During the Fourth Series production run of 1992 to 1996, Colt offered the Detective Special with an optional de-spurred 'bobbed' hammer and double action only lockwork, direct from the factory. The DAO or 'Bobbed Hammer' Detective Special was otherwise the same as the standard Fourth Series Detective Special.

In 1997, Colt released the SF-VI/DS-II (Small Frame, 6 round/Detective Special 2) is a Detective Special with a stainless steel frame and simplified for easier manufacturing in both .38 Special and .357 Magnum. In 1999, the .357 Magnum version of the SF-VI/DS-II was renamed the Colt Magnum Carry, this model was only produced for a year before the entire production of Colt revolvers (excluding the Colt Python) ceased in 2000. Therefore, ultimately ending the Detective Special line.

Ammunition
Interest has arisen over the use of higher-pressure (+P) .38 Special ammunition in the Detective Special. In their more recent owners manuals, Colt authorized limited use of +P ammunition in steel-framed revolvers (including earlier versions), citing 2000 to 3000 rounds before recommending the gun be returned to the factory for inspection. Many believe that this was due to potential liability rather than engineering requirements, as the standard pressure ammunition of yesteryear was about the same pressure as modern +P ammunition. SAAMI lowered the pressures in 1972.

Usage
Due to the good concealment qualities of the revolver, the Colt Detective Special was used as a weapon mostly by plainclothes police detectives, though it was also a popular off duty and backup firearm for uniformed police officers. It was used by bodyguards for personal defense and shooting sports.

The Colt Detective Special was a popular weapon before the semi-automatic pistol replaced the revolver in many police departments, government agencies, and militaries. Myanmar Police Force and some other countries are still using them as officers' sidearms.

Replacement
Designated as the "9.65mm handgun", the Detective Special was used by the military police officers of the Japanese Self-Defense Forces along with the M1911 pistol designated as the "11.4mm handgun", replaced by the Minebea P9 semi-automatic pistol, the Japanese license-made SIG Sauer P220. A small number were used in some prefectural police headquarters of Japan including the Tokyo Metropolitan Police Department.

The six-shot Colt Detective Special was the standard issue sidearm of Crime Wing inside Hong Kong Police Force, replaced by SIG Sauer P250 after years of use.

The Colt Detective Special was the first revolver issued to French customs agents, meant to replace the old Browning 10/22 and MAB D pistols. They were used from 1975 to 1988, being progressively replaced by Smith & Wesson revolvers (mostly the S&W model 13) along with French Manurhins and the Sig Sauer SP 2022 in 2005.

See also
 Colt Cobra
 Colt Agent
 Smith & Wesson Model 36

References

External links
The Snubnose Files
 Ballistics By The Inch tests including the Colt Detective Special.

Colt revolvers
Police weapons
Revolvers of the United States
.38 Special firearms